

Hermann-Heinrich Behrend (25 August 1898 – 19 June 1987) was a German general during World War II. He was a recipient of the Knight's Cross of the Iron Cross with Oak Leaves and Swords of Nazi Germany.

Behrend was born on 25 August 1898 in Perleberg in the Kingdom of Prussia. He joined the German Army on 1 June 1915. He fought on the Eastern Front of World War I. He was transferred to the 1st Infantry Division on 5 November 1915. While serving with this unit he was promoted to Unteroffizier (corporal) on 29 March 1916. He was promoted to Fähnrich (ensign) in 1917 for his bravery before the enemy and to Leutnant (second lieutenant) the same year.

Awards
 Iron Cross (1914) 2nd Class (9 June 1917) & 1st Class (4 November 1918)
 Military Merit Cross, 2nd Class (Mecklenburgisch-Schwerinsches-Verdienstkreuz) (2 January 1918)
 Honour Cross of the World War 1914/1918 (21 January 1935)
 Clasp to the Iron Cross (1939) 2nd Class (12 May 1940) & 1st Class (10 June 1940)
 Eastern Front Medal (29 July 1942)
 Infantry Assault Badge in Silver (20 April 1943)
 Wound Badge (1939) in Silver (29 July 1942) & in Gold (2 February 1944)
 Knight's Cross of the Iron Cross with Oak Leaves and Swords
 Knight's Cross on 15 July 1941 as Major and commander of the I./Infanterie-Regiment 489
 Oak Leaves on 6 March 1944 as Oberst and commander of Grenadier-Regiment 154
 Swords on 26 April 1945 as Generalmajor and commander of the 490. Infanterie-Division f

References

Citations

Bibliography

 
 
 

1898 births
1987 deaths
People from Perleberg
Major generals of the German Army (Wehrmacht)
German Army  personnel of World War I
Recipients of the clasp to the Iron Cross, 1st class
Recipients of the Knight's Cross of the Iron Cross with Oak Leaves and Swords
German prisoners of war in World War II held by the United Kingdom
Military personnel from Brandenburg